Ray Wong Toi-yeung (born 15 September 1993) is a Hong Kong activist. He founded the localist group Hong Kong Indigenous with other activists who were dissatisfied with the efficacy of Hong Kong's mainstream democratic movement during the 2014 Hong Kong protests. He took an active part in the Mong Kok civil unrest on Lunar New Year's Day (8 February) 2016 and was arrested later that month.

Early life and career
He was born in Hong Kong in 1993 and studied at the Tang Shiu Kin Victoria Government Secondary School and the Caritas Bianchi College of Careers and worked as a freelance interior designer.

In October 2019, he started his study at the University of Göttingen in political science and philosophy.

Founding of Hong Kong Indigenous 
Wong participated in the 2014 Hong Kong protests which is often dubbed the "Umbrella Revolution". Wong witnessed use of excessive violence by the police on unarmed citizens during the protests. Wong believes use of force is justified to prevent violence from police. After the protests, he formed Hong Kong Indigenous, a localist group, with other young protesters he met in Mong Kok who shared disappointment at the failure of the protests and disaffection with its leaders.

Hong Kong Indigenous continued to organise and participate in other social movements, notably the anti-parallel trading protests in 2015, including the "Liberate Sheung Shui" on 24 January, "Liberate Tuen Mun" on 8 February and "Liberate Yuen Long" on 1 March. He was arrested five times in relation to those protests.

Wong is often seen to be anti-Mainland immigrant and holding the view that the influx of mainland immigrants is undermining Hong Kong culture and abusing the Hong Kong welfare system. He has also stated, however, that he would regard an immigrant as a Hongkonger if he or she is willing to defend Hong Kong, its culture and values. He often cites Benedict Anderson's book Imagined Communities to explain his vision of "Hongkonger" identity.

Wong also advocates for Hong Kong's right to self-determination, and is viewed as a separatist by the pro-Beijing camp.

Mong Kok conflict 
In the Mong Kok civil unrest on Chinese New Year's Day 2016, Wong took an active role as Hong Kong Indigenous called for actions online to protect street hawkers from law enforcement officials. The protests turned into violent clashes. After the clashes, he posted a recording online saying that he was unsure what will happen to him, and it might be his “final message”. He called Hong Kong people to continue protesting and make a difference, and concluded by quoting a Chinese saying: "Rather be a shattered vessel of jade than an unbroken piece of pottery."

On 11 February, police raided Wong's home in Tseung Kwan O but did not find him there. Subsequently, Wong disappeared from all media contact. He was arrested at a friend's residence in Tin Shui Wai on 22 February and charged the next day with riot and, on 28 June, with incitement to unlawful assembly and incitement to riot. He was charged for instigating riot, joint incitement and inciting others to take part in an unlawful assembly.

Protection in Europe 
In November 2017, Wong failed to report to the police and return his travel documents to the court on 22 November after a judge-approved trip to Europe on condition of a HK$100,000 cash bail. The High Court issued an arrest warrant.

Wong was granted refugee protection in Germany in May 2018 together with Alan Li Tung-sing at a time when Hong Kong's protection for free speech and assembly and fair trials have diminished. Germany offers refugee protection to those being persecuted because of nationality, religion, political opinion or for belonging to a certain social group. He is the first British national granted asylum in the European Union. Proceedings of his asylum case obtained by Wong's lawyer showed that Chinese authorities contacted German immigration authorities in an attempt to prevent Germany from granting protection to Wong.

Wong began full-time studies in politics at the University of Göttingen in 2019.

In July 2020, Wong became one of the first batch of overseas activists wanted by Hong Kong authorities under the newly promulgated Hong Kong national security law. Wong responded by saying on his official Twitter account that he had ceased to advocate for Hong Kong independence, and that he had in fact not said anything related to that issue since the implementation of the national security law; he accused Hong Kong authorities of attempting to prosecute him retrospectively, contrary to the text of the new law itself. Germany suspended its extradition treaty with Hong Kong in response to the extradition warrant for Wong.

See also
 Edward Leung

References

1993 births
Fugitives wanted under the Hong Kong national security law
Hong Kong activists
Hong Kong localists
Hong Kong Indigenous politicians
Living people
Refugees in Germany